The Udaipur World Music Festival is a cultural event held at Udaipur city in the state of Rajasthan. In this event, artists from around the globe joins to give a variety of performances. The World Music Festival is scheduled to be an annual event, conducted every year in February. The festival features live performances by international artists. Till date, two editions has been conceptualized, the first was held on 13–14 February 2016, the second edition was held from 10–12 February 2017.

General
The first version of India's World Music Festival is conceptualized by Sanjeev Bhargava, produced by SEHER and presented by Hindustan Zinc in association with Wonder cement and Rajasthan Tourism.  The cultural organisation SEHER will be responsible for conceptualising and carrying out the event.

First Edition
The first edition of India’s first World Music Festival was held on 13 February 2016. It included global artists and ensembles from more than 12 countries, including Spain, Ghana, Venezuela, Italy, France as well as India.
Featured artists joining the event include French composer Mathias Duplessy, Rajasthani vocalist Mukhtiyar Ali, Grammy-award-winning singer Dobet Gnahoré, Sonam Kalra, the Sufi Gospel Project, the Raghu Dixit Project and many more.

Featured performers
Performers at the festival have included: 
 Mathias Duplessy
 Mukhtiyar Ali
 Dobet Gnahoré
 Sonam Kalra
 Raghu Dixit Project

Schedule
As per official information, schedule will be as follows:

13 February 2016
Venue: Fateh Sagar Paal

Afternoon (2pm - 5pm)
Instrumental Quint by
 Aleksandar Simić, 
 Saskia Rao-de Haas, 
 Shubhendra Rao, 
 Sharat Chandra Srivastava, 
 FAKHRODDIN GHAFFARI

Fado by
 Carminho

Spanish Guitar by
 José María Gallardo Del Rey

Evening (6pm - 10pm)
Venue: Railway Training Institute Ground

Flamenco Music & Dance by
 JUANMA ZURANO & TAMARA. PASO A DOS

African Beat Music by 
 Dobet Gnahoré

Fusion Rock Band by
 THE RAGHU DIXIT PROJECT

14 February 2016
Venue: Fateh Sagar Paal
Afternoon (2pm - 5pm)

Fusion of Sufi & Gospel Music by
 SONAM KALRA & THE SUFI GOSPEL PROJECT

Moroccan Saharian Soul by
 OUM

Fusion of Sufi & French Music by
 MATHIAS DUPLESSY & Mukhtiyar Ali

Evening (6pm - 10pm)

Venue:Railway Training Institute Ground

Jazz Fusion by
 ITALY MEETS INDIA

Afro Beat Venezuelan Cumbia by
 FAMILY ATLANTICA

Fusion Rock Band by
PAPON AND THE EAST INDIA COMPANY

References

External links
 

World music festivals
Culture of Udaipur
Music festivals in India